Skyline, also known as Skyline Hills or Skyline Park, is a hilly urban neighborhood in Southeastern San Diego. It is bordered by Encanto to the west, Jamacha-Lomita to the North East, and Bay Terraces to the South.  The neighborhood is split into two sections, Skyline West and Skyline East. The neighborhood is part of the Skyline-Paradise Hills Community Planning Area.

History
Prior to "white flight" in the 1960s and early 1970s, many neighborhoods in Southeast San Diego were subject to discriminatory restrictive covenants, a problem faced by African-Americans like former Councilman and Deputy Mayor George Stevens, who was denied the opportunity to purchase a house in the Skyline Hills from a white realtor.  Presently, much of the Skyline Hills, as well as other Encanto neighborhoods such as Emerald Hills, Lincoln Park, Mountain View, O'Farrell, South Encanto, and Valencia Park, have a substantial African-American population.

With the great influx of Filipino immigrants joining the United States Navy, especially from the Vietnam War era on to the 1990s, many Filipinos inhabited the Southeast San Diego neighborhoods of Alta Vista, Bay Terraces, Paradise Hills, Shelltown, Skyline Hills, and Valencia Park, both for the relatively affordable housing prices and its close proximity to Naval Base San Diego.

Geography
The Skyline-Paradise Hills Community as a whole make up approximately 4,500 acres. Much like the surrounding neighborhoods of Bay Terraces, Paradise Hills, and Jamacha-Lomita, Skyline is comprised predominantly of low-density single-family homes spread across the hilly area. A major geographic feature is Paradise Valley, which runs on an east-west axis through the middle of the community and gives rise to the Paradise Creek, which flows into San Diego Bay. Skyline, along with North Bay Terrace, Jamacha, and Lomita are north of Paradise Valley Rd.

Demographics
Skyline is a very diverse neighborhood and home to one of the largest concentrations of African-Americans in the City. Current demographics for the neighborhood are as follows: people of Hispanic heritage make up 36.4%, followed by African-Americans at 31.6%, Asian at 19.9%, non-Hispanic Whites 7.0%, Mixed Race at 4.4% and others 0.6% It ranked 112 out of 125 San Diego neighborhoods in terms of lowest percentage of non-Hispanic whites, and 13 out of 125 San Diego neighborhoods in terms of total population that is non-White (roughly 93.0%).

Image
Much like other neighborhoods in Southeast San Diego, Skyline consists of postwar tract homes built in the 1950s and 1960's that have been outfitted with iron bars over the ground-floor windows and doors, as well as cast-iron gates and chain-link fences guarding driveways, a reflection of the perceived need for security in these historically high-crime urban neighborhoods. The area in and around the Meadowbrook Apartments, an expansive low-income housing project in the adjacent Bay Terraces neighborhood, is a central nucleus of much of Skyline's drug and gang issues.

Skyline has endured decades of narcotic problems and gang violence, and was the target of several law enforcement operations and sweeps, targeting the Skyline East Side Piru gang in particular, an offshoot gang started by members of the Eastside Hanging Gang (EHG) and a relocated Piru gang member from Compton, and believed to be one of the largest Blood gangs in San Diego. Hundreds of members of the gang have been arrested as a result of these periodic sweeps since 1990. The East Side Pirus are referenced along other Piru affiliated groups as "the Skylines" in the 1993 single, "Piru Love" by Los Angeles-based rap group, Bloods & Crips. They have held a long-bitter rivalry with the Lincoln Park Bloods, which has been attributed to much of the violent crime and homicides across Southeast San Diego.

Notable Hip Hop artist, Lecrae, who spent significant portions of his life living with his grandmother in Skyline, experienced much of the violence occurring in the community, and has paid tribute to the neighborhood in his songs including his 2013 single, "I'm Turnt," ("It's Southeast Daygo in the building, shout out to Peter Pan, Skyline, Imperial"), and the 2019 single, "California Dreamin'" with 116, ("What up Southeast? (Daygo), raised me to be a lil' beast, caught a couple fades in the streets, played on the beach ...I'm rollin' down Imperial, old school in my stereo, from Skyline, you don't hear me, though (Skyline))." The music video for the latter was filmed entirely in the Skyline neighborhood that he grew up in.

Government
Skyline is within the 4th City Council District. The district has long been represented by Myrtle Cole since she won a special election in 2013 through 2018. It is currently represented by Monica Montgomery Steppe, who assumed office in 2018. Federally, the neighborhood is within the California's 53rd congressional district.

Education

Skyline is served primarily by the San Diego Unified School District along with some charter and private schools. Schools that serve Skyline students include Morse High School, the largest school in the area, Keiller Leadership Academy, a college-preparatory charter school partnered with the University of San Diego, and The O'Farrell Charter Schools, an educational complex chartered as multiple schools in one, located at just the in-between area of Skyline and South Encanto.

Much like the rest of Southeast San Diego, many students in Skyline have taken advantage of San Diego Unified School District's Voluntary Enrollment Exchange Program (VEEP), and have opted to be bused to high schools in San Diego's more affluent northern suburban neighborhoods,. Depending on their VEEP Allied School Pattern, a high school student may be voluntarily bused to Mira Mesa High School, Mission Bay High School, Scripps Ranch High School, Serra High School, and University City High School.

References

Neighborhoods in San Diego